Joseph Bailey (born 1812 – died 1850), was a British Conservative Party politician. He was a Member of Parliament (MP) for Sudbury from 1837 to 1841, and for Herefordshire from 1841 to 1850.

His father was Sir Joseph Bailey, 1st Baronet.

References 

1812 births
1850 deaths
Conservative Party (UK) MPs for English constituencies
UK MPs 1837–1841
UK MPs 1841–1847
UK MPs 1847–1852